The canton of Gorges de l'Allier-Gévaudan is an administrative division of the Haute-Loire department, south-central France. It was created at the French canton reorganisation which came into effect in March 2015. Its seat is in Langeac.

It consists of the following communes:
 
Auvers
La Besseyre-Saint-Mary
Chanaleilles
Chanteuges
Charraix
Chazelles
Cubelles
Desges
Esplantas-Vazeilles
Grèzes
Langeac
Monistrol-d'Allier
Pébrac
Pinols
Prades
Saint-Arcons-d'Allier
Saint-Bérain
Saint-Christophe-d'Allier
Saint-Julien-des-Chazes
Saint-Préjet-d'Allier
Saint-Vénérand
Saugues
Siaugues-Sainte-Marie
Tailhac
Thoras
Venteuges

References

Cantons of Haute-Loire